Bade is a village located in the Chümoukedima District of Nagaland and is a suburb of Chümoukedima, the district headquarters.

Demographics
Bade is situated in the Chümoukedima District of Nagaland. As per the Population Census 2011, there are a total 497 households in Bade. The total population of Bade is 2289.

See also
Chümoukedima District

References

Villages in Chümoukedima district